Meleti Ross Melehes (born 7 January 1977 in Guelph, Ontario) is a Greek baseball player who competed in the 2004 Summer Olympics. He played for the London Werewolves of the Frontier League in 1999. His 3.00 ERA led all Greek team pitchers with 3+ innings in the Athens Games.

References

1977 births
Living people
Canadian people of Greek descent
Sportspeople from Guelph
London Werewolves players
Canadian baseball players
Greek baseball players
Olympic baseball players of Greece
Baseball players at the 2004 Summer Olympics
Baseball people from Ontario